Faraba is a village in north-western Ivory Coast. It is in the sub-prefecture of Dianra-Village, Dianra Department, Béré Region, Woroba District. It has a population of 5934.

Faraba was a commune until March 2012, when it became one of 1126 communes nationwide that were abolished.

Notes

Former communes of Ivory Coast
Populated places in Woroba District
Populated places in Béré Region